Platydoris inframaculata is a species of sea slug, a dorid nudibranch, shell-less marine opisthobranch gastropod mollusks in the family Discodorididae.

Distribution
This species was described from Ambon Island, Indonesia. It has also been studied in the Philippines and reported from Sri Lanka.

References

Discodorididae
Gastropods described in 1877